Eubulus is the name of:

People:
 Eubulus (banker), 4th century BC Bithynian banker and ruler of Atarneus 
 Eubulus (statesman) (c. 405 BC – c. 335 BC), Athenian statesman
 Eubulus (poet), 4th century BC Athenian poet
 Saint Eubulus (died 308), Greek Christian martyr
 Eubulus, a Praetorian prefect of Illyricum (in the Roman Empire) in 436
 Eubulus le Strange, 1st Baron Strange (died 1335), English baron
 Eubulus or Eubule Thelwall (c. 1557 – 1630), Welsh lawyer, academic and politician who sat in the House of Commons

Characters in English plays:
 Eubulus, from the 1561 play Gorboduc
 Eubulus, from the 1673 play Marriage à la mode by John Dryden
 Eubulus, from the 17th century play The Coronation

Other uses:
 Eubulus, an associate of the Apostle Paul mentioned in the Second Epistle to Timothy (4:21)
 Eubulus, 1913 winner of the Australian VRC Sires Produce Stakes Thoroughbred horse race
 Eubulus (beetle), a genus of weevils in the family Curculionidae